Kaveh Malek (also Romanized as Kāveh Malek) is a village in Goli Jan Rural District, in the Central District of Tonekabon County, Mazandaran Province, Iran. At the 2006 census, its population was 70, in 15 families.

References 

Populated places in Tonekabon County